Oakenshaw is a village located in both the City of Bradford and Kirklees in West Yorkshire, England. It is located midway between the town of Cleckheaton in Kirklees and the suburb of Wyke in Bradford. The village is close to the M606 motorway. The village's main shopping centre is on Bradford Road and its main church, dedicated to St Andrew, is a grade II listed building.

Transport
The village is served by Low Moor railway station on the Calder Valley line with services to Leeds, Bradford Interchange and Manchester Victoria. Another line serving the village was the Spen Valley Line which ran from Low Moor to Mirfield via Cleckheaton and Heckmondwike. Another branch of the line connected to Dewsbury but this line closed in 1965 to all traffic. It is now the Spen Valley Greenway.

Gallery

Sport and leisure

Cricket 
Woodlands Cricket Club, established in 1894, is an amateur cricket club based on Albert Terrace. They have two Senior XI teams in the Bradford Premier League and an established junior section that play competitave cricket in the Bradford Junior Cricket League.

See also
Listed buildings in Cleckheaton
Listed buildings in Wyke

References

External links 

 

Villages in West Yorkshire
Geography of Kirklees
Geography of the City of Bradford